William Dale (17 February 1905 – 1987) was an English footballer who played as a full-back.

Born in Manchester, he started his career with Sandbach Ramblers before joining Manchester United as an amateur in April 1925. He turned professional in May 1926 and made his debut on 25 August 1928, playing at right-back in a 1–1 draw with Leicester City at Old Trafford. In six years at United, Dale made 64 appearances for the club, before joining Manchester City in December 1931. He had a six-year career in the blue of Manchester City, appearing 236 times, winning the 1937 FA Charity Shield against Sunderland. He later played for Ipswich Town before the Second World War brought his career to a halt.

Career statistics

References

1905 births
1987 deaths
English footballers
Footballers from Manchester
Association football fullbacks
Sandbach Ramblers F.C. players
Manchester United F.C. players
Manchester City F.C. players
Ipswich Town F.C. players
FA Cup Final players